Aonghus Fionn Ó Dálaigh (known as "The Pious"), was an Irish poet, fl. 1520–1570.

Thought to have been born in County Meath, Aonghus Fionn was the head of the branch of the Ó Dálaigh family who were poets to the MacCarthy of Desmond. Only three of his poems are extant: Cionnus dhíolfad mo luach leighis?, Grian na Maighdean Máthair Dé and Ná déana díomas, a dhuine.

References

 Dioghluim Dána, Láimhbheartach Mac Cionnaith Lambert McKenna (ed), Dublin, Oifig an tSoláthair [Government Publication Office], 1938, pp. 415–419
 The Surnames of Ireland, Edward MacLysaght, 1978.

External links
 http://www.ucc.ie/celt/itbardic.html#athairne
 http://www.irishtimes.com/ancestor/surname/index.cfm?fuseaction=Go.&UserID=

16th-century Irish-language poets
People from County Meath
1520 births
Irish religious writers
Year of death missing
People of Elizabethan Ireland